Ciudad Sandino is a city and municipality in the Managua department of Nicaragua.

Located just outside western Managua, it had an estimated population of 109,644 in mid-2015.

History 
The beginning of the foundation of Ciudad Sandino goes back to the year of 1969, when serious floods occur due to the rise of Lake Xolotlán, product of a tropical depression in Nicaragua. The neighborhoods adjacent to the coast of the lake such as La Tejera, Miralagos, Quinta Nina, Acahualinca and others were affected by the phenomenon, having to move its inhabitants to a safer place.

Notable residents 

 Yader Cardozo

See also 

 CECIM

References

Municipalities of the Managua Department